Chamber or The Chamber may refer to:

Organizations and government 
Chamber of commerce, a form of business network
Legislative chamber, a deliberative assembly within a legislature
Debate chamber, a room for people to discuss and debate

Arts and entertainment
Chamber (character), in Marvel comics 
The Chamber (game show), an American TV show
The Chamber (novel), by John Grisham, 1994
The Chamber (1996 film), based on the novel
The Chamber (2016 film), a survival film 
 , a German musical ensemble

Other uses
 Chamber (firearms), part of a weapon
 Combustion chamber, part of an engine in which fuel is burned
 Environmental chamber, used in testing environmental conditions
 Execution chamber, where capital punishment is carried out
 Gas chamber, apparatus for killing humans or animals
 Chambar, or Chamber, a town in Pakistan

See also

Chambers (disambiguation)
Chamber music (disambiguation)
Great chamber, in an English castle or manor house
 Room